Niobium phosphide is an inorganic compound of niobium and phosphorus with the chemical formula NbP.

Synthesis
Sintering powdered niobium and phosphorus:
 4Nb + P4 -> 4NbP

Physical properties
The compound is a unique material combining topological and conventional electronic phases. Its superfast electrons demonstrate extremely large magnetoresistance, so NbP may be suitable for use in new electronic components.

It does not dissolve in water.

Niobium phosphide, like tantalum arsenide TaAs, is a topological Weyl semimetal.

Uses
The compound is a semiconductor used in high power, high frequency applications and in laser diodes.

References

Phosphides
Niobium(III) compounds
Semiconductors